Francisco Arellano (6 December 1896 – 6 May 1976) was a Chilean footballer. He played in three matches for the Chile national football team in 1924. He was also part of Chile's squad for the 1924 South American Championship, and for the 1928 Summer Olympics, but he did not play in any matches in the latter.

References

External links
 

1896 births
1976 deaths
Chilean footballers
Chile international footballers
Association football midfielders
Deportes Magallanes footballers